Taftan or taftoon is a leavened flour bread from Iranian, Indian and Pakistani cuisines.  It is made with refined flour, milk, yoghurt, and eggs and baked in a clay oven. It is sometimes flavoured with saffron and a small amount of cardamom powder, and may be decorated with seeds such as poppy seeds.

See also
 Barbari bread
 Lavash, an unleavened flatbread
 Pita
 Samoon
 Sangak, a leavened flatbread found in Iran
 Sheermal, similar to taftan, often with added fruits and murabba

References

Iranian breads
Indian breads
Indian cuisine
Iranian cuisine
Pakistani breads
Flatbreads